Thank God It Wasn't A Peso is a Mexican fairy tale collected by Americo Paredes in Ajusco, Mexico from J. F., a mestizo man in his fifties, and included by him in Folktales of Mexico.  It is Aarne–Thompson type 1689, Thank God They Weren't Peaches.

Synopsis
A drunkard begs an image of the Sacred Heart for a peso every morning.  A sexton wraps a half-peso piece in paper with a rock to give it some weight, and throws it to him.  It hits him in the head.  The drunkard finds the coin and says if it had been a full peso, it would have killed him.

References

Mexican fairy tales
ATU 1675-1724